Michael Cutright (born May 10, 1967) is an American former basketball player. A 6'4 guard, He was named to Southland Conference 1980's All-Decade Men's Basketball Team, which also includes Joe Dumars and Karl Malone.  He was drafted in the second round of the 1989 NBA draft by the Denver Nuggets.

References 

1967 births
Living people
American men's basketball players
Basketball players from Louisiana
Birmingham Bandits players
Denver Nuggets draft picks
Guards (basketball)
La Crosse Catbirds players
McNeese Cowboys basketball players
Pensacola Tornados (1986–1991) players
Rochester Renegade players